Margaret of Cleves, also spelled Margaretha or Margarethe ( – after 1348) was the wife of Count Adolf II of the Marck and mother of Adolf III of the Marck.  She was a daughter of Count Dietrich VIII of Cleves and Margaret of Guelders, who was a daughter of Reginald I of Guelders.

On 15 March 1332, she married Count Adolf II of the Marck.  In 1333, her father issued an inheritance law, which said that after his death, the County of Cleves should fall to Margaret and her sisters Elisabeth and Maria.  His younger brother John objected, and in 1338, this law was repealed.

Adolf II, Margaret's husband, died in 1346, before her father died.  Her eldest son, Engelbert III succeeded as Count of the Marck.  After her father, Count Dietrich VIII of Cleves, died on 7 July 1347, Margaret and her sons Engelbert III and Adolf III tried to secure the Cleves territory.  Initisally, they were supported by her cousin, Reginald III of Guelders.  Nevertheless, her uncle, Count John, prevailed.

John died in 1368.  After his death, the Count of the Marck could finally assert their right to inherit Cleves.  Adolf succeeded as Count, her third son Dietrich received most of the holdings on the right bank of the Rhine.

Issue 
Adolph and Margaret of Cleves had seven children:
 Engelbert III (28 Feb 1333-Wetter 22 Dec 1391), married:
 in 1354 to Richardis of Jülich (d. 1360), a daughter of William V, Duke of Jülich
 in 1381 Elisabeth of Sponheim-Sayn (d. 1416), a daughter of Count Simon III of Vianden
 Adolf III (1334 - 7 Sep 1394, Cleves), Archbishop of Cologne 1363-1364, later Count of Cleves and Count of the Marck
 Dietrich (1336-25 May 1406), bishop of Liège 1389, from which post he later resigned.
 Eberhard (1341-after 1360), priest at Münster.
 Margareta (-12 Sep 1409), married John I, Count of Nassau-Siegen
 Mechtild (-after 18 Oct 1390), married Eberhard of Isenburg-Grenzau.
 Elisabeth, married Gumprecht of Heppendorf.

External links 
 Entry for Margaret at genealogie-mittelalter.de
 History of Cleves
 Genealogical tables
 Etwas zur History of the Marck

Countesses of Mark
1310s births
14th-century deaths
Year of birth unknown
Year of death uncertain
14th-century German nobility
14th-century German women